Zhangixalus chenfui, also known as Chinese whipping frog or Chenfu's treefrog, is a species of frog in the family Rhacophoridae endemic to China where it is found in Sichuan, Guizhou, Hubei, and Fujian provinces. Its natural habitats are temperate forests, subtropical moist lowland forests, subtropical moist montane forests, subtropical moist shrubland, freshwater marshes, rural gardens, ponds, and irrigated land. It is not considered a threatened species by the IUCN.

References

chenfui
Amphibians of China
Endemic fauna of China
Taxonomy articles created by Polbot
Amphibians described in 1945